Shauna Coxsey  (born 27 January 1993) is an English professional rock climber. She is the most successful competition climber in the UK, having won the IFSC Bouldering World Cup Season in both 2016 and 2017. She retired from competition climbing after competing in the 2020 Olympics.

Early life
Coxsey was born on 27 January 1993 in Runcorn, Cheshire. She began climbing in 1997 at age four, inspired by a television broadcast of Catherine Destivelle climbing in Mali.

Career

Coxsey was mainly active in competition climbing and has participated in several international competitions in bouldering. She has won the British Bouldering Championships on multiple occasions. In 2012, she won the 9th edition of the Melloblocco and placed 2nd in the World Cup stages in Log-Dragomer and Innsbruck. She finished third in the 2012 Bouldering World Cup. In 2013, she cleanly ascended her first problem graded  when she climbed Nuthin' But Sunshine in Rocky Mountain National Park. In November, she was appointed one of the UK's first British Mountaineering Council Ambassadors. In 2014, she placed second overall in the IFSC Bouldering World Cup, and fourth at the Bouldering World Championships in Munich. The same year, she became the third woman ever to boulder  when she topped New Baseline in Magic Wood near the Swiss town of Chur. In 2015, she won the British Bouldering Championships in Sheffield and took first place at the Bouldering World Cup in Munich.

Coxsey was appointed Member of the Order of the British Empire (MBE) in the 2016 Birthday Honours for services to climbing. In late 2016, she suffered a shoulder injury which prevented her from competing in that year's Bouldering World Championships, despite topping the overall rankings in the Bouldering World Cup. She won four IFSC Climbing World Cups in Meiringen (SUI), Kazo (JPN), Innsbruck (AUT) and Sheffield (UK). At the World Cup in Munich (GER) she placed second. In 2017, she again won four Bouldering World Cup stages, in Meiringen (SUI), Kazo (JPN), Mumbai (IND) and Vail (USA). In Munich (GER) she again placed second and secured the overall 2017 title. In August 2019, she won two bronze medals at the 2019 IFSC Climbing World Championships in Hachioji, in bouldering and the combined event. During the finals of the combined event, she set a British women's speed climbing record of 9.141 seconds, securing second place in the speed component of the combined ranking by winning races against Futaba Ito and Miho Nonaka before losing to Aleksandra Miroslaw. Additionally, by reaching the finals of the combined event, she secured a qualification spot for Tokyo's 2020 Summer Olympics, the first to include competitive climbing. When the Olympics was finally in 2021, she was recovering from a back injury, surgical treatment and rehabilitation. She came 10th in the competition. She planned to discontinue competitive climbing after the Olympics,  but to continue as an elite-level rock climber.  

In 2022 she continued climbing on indoor climbing walls while pregnant with her first child. She worked with a specialist physiotherapist, and her husband who is also a climber, to assess the routes as her shape changed.

Rankings

World Cup

World Championships 
Youth

Adult

World Cup podiums

Bouldering

Outdoor bouldering
Coxsey is the first British woman to climb the V12, V13, and V14 grades.

:
 New Base Line – Magic Wood (SWI) – 12 July 2014 – First female ascent of Bernd Zangerl's Boulder (2002)

:

 Ropes of Maui – Dinas Mot – 5 April 2016 – First female ascent (first ascent by Pete Robins, 2014)
 One Summer in Paradise – Magic Wood (SWI) – 3 July 2014 – Second female ascent (first ascent by Martin Keller, 2005)
 Zarzaparrilla – Albarracin (ESP) – 31 March 2014 – First female ascent
 Nuthin But Sunshine – Lower Chaos (Rocky Mountain National Park, USA) – 26 June 2013 – First female ascent (first ascent by Dave Graham, 2000)

See also
List of grade milestones in rock climbing
History of rock climbing
Rankings of most career IFSC gold medals

References

External links

 
 

 Red Bull profile
 
 
 

British rock climbers
Female climbers
Living people
1993 births
Sportspeople from Runcorn
Members of the Order of the British Empire
Sport climbers at the 2020 Summer Olympics
Olympic sport climbers of Great Britain
IFSC Climbing World Championships medalists
IFSC Climbing World Cup overall medalists
Boulder climbers